Ben x Jim is a 2020 Philippine boy's love web series produced by Regal Entertainment. Written and directed by Easy Ferrer, it stars Teejay Marquez and Jerome Ponce as childhood friends who fall in love years later in a reunion amid the confining space of quarantine in their neighborhood amid the pandemic.

The series premiered on YouTube on October 15, 2020, airing on Thursdays at 8:00 PM PST and ran for seven episodes. A second season for the series was announced on January 16 by Regal Entertainment. The official trailer for the second season was also released the same day and it is set to release on February 12, 2021, via Upstream.PH.

Cast and characters 
 Teejay Marquez as Benjamin "Ben" Mendoza, Jim's childhood friend and currently living alone next door
 Jerome Ponce as Jimson "Jim" Alcantara, Ben's childhood friend and car enthusiast from Davao 
 Sarah Edwards as Yana, Jim's girlfriend
 Kat Galang as Flo Guimary, Ben's very close friend
 Ron Martin Angeles as Olan, motorcycle rider for Deliver Lover
 Johannes Rissler as Leo Portugues, Ben's ex-boyfriend
 Christina Simon as Elma Magtibay, Ben's neighbor and housekeeper next door, also Jim's former nanny
 Royce Cabrera as Roy, Ben's current boyfriend
 Vance Larena as Val, Jim's boss

Episodes

Season 1

Season 2

Reception 

YouTube views as of August 4, 2021:

Sequel
On November 26, 2020, after the premiere of the Season 1 Finale, Teejay Marquez announced via his YouTube channel on the comment section of Episode 7 that the series will have its second season.

A second season for the series was announced on January 16 by Regal Entertainment. The official trailer for the second season was also released the same day in celebration for Regal Entertainment's Youtube Channel surpassing the 2 Million Subscriber mark. The actors from the first season, Teejay Marquez, Jerome Ponce, Sarah Edwards, Ron Angeles and Kat Galang, will recur their roles along with new cast members Vance Larena, Royce Cabrera, Ejay Jallorina, Miko Gallardo, Darwin Yu, Anika Dela Cruz, Jomari Angeles. The season is set to release on February 12, 2021.

Release

TV
On September 8, GMA Network announced that it is set to bring the hit BL series ‘Ben X Jim’ starting September 26, 2021, through Heart of Asia Channel in Digital TV Box Nationwide.

Soundtrack

See also 
 Gameboys
 Hello Stranger
 Gaya Sa Pelikula
 Boys Lockdown
 Oh, Mando!
 The Boy Foretold by the Stars

References

External links

2020 web series debuts
2021 web series endings
Philippine LGBT-related web series